The 1878 Canadian federal election was held on September 17, 1878 to elect members of the House of Commons of the 4th Parliament of Canada. It resulted in the end of Prime Minister Alexander Mackenzie's Liberal government after only one term in office. Canada suffered an economic depression during Mackenzie's term, and his party was punished by voters for it. The Liberals' policy of free trade also hurt their support with the business establishment in Toronto and Montreal.

Sir John A. Macdonald and his Conservative Party were returned to power after having been defeated four years before amidst scandals over the building of the Canadian Pacific Railway.

National results 

Note:

* Party did not nominate candidates in the previous election.

Acclamations

The following Members of Parliament were elected by acclamation;
 British Columbia: 1 Conservative, 1 Liberal-Conservative
 Manitoba: 2 Conservatives, 1 Liberal-Conservative
 Quebec: 1 Conservative, 2 Liberal-Conservatives, 1 Liberal
 New Brunswick: 1 Liberal, 1 Independent

Results by province

Further reading

Notes

References

See also
 
List of Canadian federal general elections
4th Canadian Parliament

1878
1878 elections in Canada
September 1878 events